The Vienna Genesis (Vienna, Österreichische Nationalbibliothek, cod. theol. gr. 31), designated by siglum L (Ralphs), is an illuminated manuscript, probably produced in Syria in the first half of the 6th century. It is the oldest well-preserved, surviving, illustrated biblical codex.

Description 
The text is a fragment of the Book of Genesis in the Greek Septuagint translation. The text is frequently abbreviated. There are twenty-four surviving folios each with miniatures at the bottom of both sides. It is thought that there were originally about ninety-six folios and 192 illustrations. It is written in uncials with silver ink on calfskin vellum dyed a rich purple. This shade of purple dye was also used to dye imperial cloth.

The initial iota and upsilon have the diaeresis.

The illustrations are done in a naturalistic style common to Roman painting of the period.  The manuscript's illustrations are, in format, transitional between those found in scrolls and later images found in codices.  Each illustration is painted at the bottom of a single page. However, within a single illustration, two or more episodes from a story may be included, so that the same person may be represented multiple times within a single illustration. There are both framed and unframed illustrations. The illustrations contain incidents and people not mentioned in the text of Genesis. These incidents are thought to have been derived from popular elaborations of the story or from Jewish commentaries on the text.

The Vienna Genesis may have been produced in the same period and place as the Rossano Gospels and the Sinope Gospels.

See also
 Early Christian art and architecture
 Codex Cottonianus – another illuminated Greek manuscript of the Book of Genesis

References

Further reading 
 Die Wiener Genesis, hrsg. von Wilhelm von Hartel und Franz Wickhoff, in: Jahrbuch der kunsthistorischen Sammlungen des Allerhöchsten Kaiserhauses, 15/16, 1895; Neudr. Graz 1970.
 Calkins, Robert G. Illuminated Manuscripts of the Middle Ages. Ithaca, New York: Cornell University Press, 1983. pages 21–22.
 Walther, Ingo F. and Norbert Wolf. Codices Illustres: The world's most famous illuminated manuscripts, 400 to 1600. Köln, TASCHEN, 2005.
Weitzmann, Kurt, ed., Age of spirituality: late antique and early Christian art, third to seventh century, no. 410, 1979, Metropolitan Museum of Art, New York, 
 Weitzmann, Kurt.  Late Antique and Early Christian Book Illumination. New York: George Braziller, 1977.
 Zimmermann, Barbara. Die Wiener Genesis im Rahmen der antiken Buchmalerei. Ikonographie, Darstellung, Illustrationsverfahren und Aussageintention. Wiesbaden: Reichert, 2003.

External links
 M. C. Swern, The Iconography of the Creation of Adam and Eve In Early Christian Manuscript Recensions, 1965.
 Digital Images of the manuscript online at the Austrian National Library.

Illuminated biblical manuscripts
Byzantine illuminated manuscripts
6th-century biblical manuscripts
Septuagint manuscripts
6th-century illuminated manuscripts
Biblical manuscripts of the Austrian National Library
Purple parchment